David Clare Holloway (1927 - 2014) was a bestselling Australian author and war historian.

Biography 

He was born on 28 February 1927 in Brisbane, Australia. He was the son of World War One veteran Eric Mansfield Holloway.

He was raised mainly in Chinchilla, Australia, and Canberra, Australia.

He died on 15 October 2014.

Education  

He completed his schooling in Melbourne, Australia.

Career 

He served in the Royal Australian Navy towards the end of World War Two.

After his military service, he attended teacher's college in Melbourne and served as the teacher and head teacher at various Victorian country schools before becoming a School Inspector, until promoted to assistant Director of Education, primary division.

Bibliography 

His notable books include:

 The Inspectors
 Dark Somme Flowing
 Combat colonels of the AIF in the Great War
 Hooves, wheels & tracks: A history of the 4th/19th Prince of Wales's Regiment
 Endure and Fight

References

External links 
 Biography 1
 Biography 2
 Parliament of Australia

Australian writers
Australian soldiers
1927 births
2014 deaths